Loyden is a surname. Notable people with the surname include:

 Eddie Loyden (1923–2003), British politician
 Eddie Loyden (born 1945), English footballer
 Jillian Loyden (born 1985), American soccer player

See also
 Lodden